is a Japanese footballer who last played for Iwaki FC.

Career statistics

Club
.

Notes

References

1993 births
Living people
Japanese footballers
Japanese expatriate footballers
Japan youth international footballers
Association football defenders
Slovenian PrvaLiga players
FC Girondins de Bordeaux players
Dijon FCO players
NK Radomlje players
Iwaki FC players
Japanese expatriate sportspeople in France
Expatriate footballers in France
Expatriate footballers in Slovenia